Dolichol-phosphate mannosyltransferase is an enzyme that in humans is encoded by the DPM1 gene.

Function 

Dolichol-phosphate mannose (Dol-P-Man) serves as a donor of mannosyl residues on the lumenal side of the endoplasmic reticulum (ER).  Lack of Dol-P-Man results in defective surface expression of GPI-anchored proteins.  Dol-P-Man is synthesized from GDP-mannose and dolichol-phosphate on the cytosolic side of the ER by the enzyme dolichyl-phosphate mannosyltransferase.  Human DPM1 lacks a carboxy-terminal transmembrane domain and signal sequence and is regulated by DPM2.

Model organisms
Model organisms have been used in the study of DPM1 function. A conditional knockout mouse line called Dpm1tm1b(KOMP)Wtsi was generated at the Wellcome Trust Sanger Institute. Male and female animals underwent a standardized phenotypic screen to determine the effects of deletion. Additional screens performed: - In-depth immunological phenotyping

References

Further reading

External links 
  GeneReviews/NCBI/NIH/UW entry on Congenital Disorders of Glycosylation Overview